Cystonectae is a suborder of siphonophores.  It includes the Portuguese man o' war (Physalia physalis) and Bathyphysa conifera, sometimes called the "flying spaghetti monster."

In Japanese, it is called .

The typical cystonect body plan has a pneumatophore (float) and siphosome (line of polyps) but no nectosome (propulsion medusae).

References

 
Siphonophorae
Cnidarian suborders
Taxa named by Ernst Haeckel
Taxa described in 1887